Sega or Shai-Sega (meaning Meadows of Sega) was an ancient Egyptian town located in the 4th Upper Egyptian nome. It is first attested in the tomb of Ankhtifi, the nomarch of Hierakonpolis loyal to the rulers of the 10th Dynasty in Heracleopolis Magna.

Siege by Ankhtifi 
In his tomb, Ankhtifi recalls siding with Heracleopolitan kings by initiating a campaign against a coalition of Thebes and Coptos (4th and 5th Upper Egyptian nomes respectively). Sailing downstream from Hefat (modern day El-Mo'alla), he claims finding no resistance from the Thebans in a fortress called Semekhsen near modern-day Armant. He then sails further downstream, where he claims that residents of a town called Shai-Sega have bolted its door bolts, in fear of Ankhtifi. He decides to lay siege on the town.

Location 
The town's only attestation hitherto comes from the tomb of Ankhtifi and it is not mentioned in other periods of ancient Egyptian history, rendering it a lost city.

See also 
 Ankhtifi
 El-Mo'alla
 First Intermediate Period of Egypt

Bibliography 
 Vandier, Jacques. Mo’alla: La tombe d’Ankhtifi et la tombe de Sébekhotep. Institut Francais d’Archéologie Orientale, Cairo, 1950.

References

External links 
 Pillar 2 - Sections 7 and 8

Cities in ancient Egypt
Lost ancient cities and towns
Former populated places in Egypt
Archaeological sites in Egypt
Tenth Dynasty of Egypt
First Intermediate Period of Egypt